G-Day a series of events held by Google in Latin America, Middle East, Africa and India for developers, etc.

G-Day may also refer to:

G-Day in military designation of days and hours is the unnamed day on which an order, normally national, is given to deploy a unit
G'day, an Australian English greeting
gDay, a  primitive data type in XML Schema (W3C)